Centaurea leptophylla, the thin-leaved centaury, is a flowering plant in the family Asteraceae. The IUCN has classified the species as critically endangered. It is native to Turkey.

Taxonomy 
It was named by Karl Koch in Linnaea 24: 419 in 1851.

References 

leptophylla